Santiago Abreu may refer to
Santiago Abreú, governor of Santa Fe de Nuevo México (New Mexico) from 1832 to 1833.
Santiago Polanco Abreu, a Resident Commissioner of Puerto Rico.